On the Definition of Word is a 1987 book by Anna Maria Di Sciullo and Edwin S. Williams in which the authors examine the notion of word in linguistics. They distinguish four concepts of "word":  listemes,  morphological objects,  syntactic atoms, and  phonological words. The authors' main claim is that there is a strict distinction between syntax and morphology.

Reception 
Andrew Carstairs, Mark Baker, Sofia Ananiadou and Masayuki Ike-uchi have reviewed the book.

References

1987 non-fiction books
Morphology books
MIT Press books
Syntax books
Words